Mr. Yuk is a trademarked graphic image, created by UPMC Children's Hospital of Pittsburgh, and widely employed in the United States in labeling of substances that are poisonous if ingested.

Objective

To help children learn to avoid ingesting poisons, Mr. Yuk was conceived by Richard Moriarty, a pediatrician and clinical professor of pediatrics at the University of Pittsburgh School of Medicine who founded the Pittsburgh Poison Center and the National Poison Center Network.  Moriarty felt that the traditional skull and crossbones representing poison was no longer appropriate for children; Congressman Bill Coyne later said that by the 1970s the symbol was "associated with swashbuckling pirates and buccaneers rather than with harmful substances."

The design and color were chosen when Moriarty used focus groups of young children to determine which combination was the most unappealing. Possible expressions were "mad" (crossed eyes and intense expression), "dead" (a sunken mouth and Xs for eyes), and "sick" (a sour expression with the tongue sticking out). Children were asked to rank the faces according to which they liked the best, along with the skull and crossbones, and the "sick" face was least popular. The shade of fluorescent green that was chosen was christened "Yucky!" by a young child and gave the design its name.

History
In 1971 the Pittsburgh Poison Centre issued the Mr. Yuk sticker. Over the next few years, Mr. Yuk stickers were used nationwide to promote poison centres in the United States of America. The stickers usually contained phone numbers of poison control centers that may give guidance if poisoning has occurred or is suspected. Usually, Mr. Yuk stickers carried the national toll-free number 1-800-222-1222. In some areas, local poison control centers and children's hospitals issue stickers with local numbers, under license. A  public service announcement was also produced in 1971 featuring a theme song.

Effectiveness
At least two peer-reviewed medical studies (Fergusson 1982, Vernberg 1984) have suggested that Mr. Yuk stickers do not effectively keep children away from potential poisons and may even attract children. Specifically, Vernberg and colleagues note concerns for using the stickers to protect young children. Fergusson and colleagues state that "the method may be effective with older children or as an adjunct to an integrated poisoning prevention campaign".

To evaluate the effectiveness of six projected symbols (skull-and-crossbones, red stop sign, and four others), tests were conducted at day care centers. Children in the program rated Mr. Yuk as the most unappealing image. By contrast, children rated the skull-and-crossbones to be the most appealing.

Licensing
Mr. Yuk and his graphic rendering are registered trademarks and service marks of the UPMC Children's Hospital of Pittsburgh, and the rendering itself is additionally protected by copyright. The Children's Hospital of Pittsburgh of UPMC gives out free sheets of Mr. Yuk stickers if contacted by mail.

See also 
 Emoticon
 Hazard symbol
 Mr. Ouch
 Smiley
 Poison control center

References

External links 
 Mr. Yuk Information Page
  American Association of Poison Control Centers
  Acceptable Labelling on Pesticide Containers
 Original Mr.Yuk Public Service Announcement On YouTube

Symbols introduced in 1971
Male characters in advertising
Public service announcement characters
Public service announcements of the United States
Poison control centers
Culture of Pittsburgh
Pictograms
Stickers
Children's health in the United States
Articles containing video clips